Free electron in physics may refer to:
Electron, as a free particle
Solvated electron
Charge carrier, as carriers of electric charge
Valence electron, as an outer shell electron that is associated with an atom
Valence and conduction bands, as a conduction band electron relative to the electronic band structure of a solid
Fermi gas, as a particle of a non-interacting electron gas
Free electron model, as a particle in the Drude-Sommerfeld model of metals
Free-electron laser, as a particle in the electron beam

See also 
Independent electron approximation
Lone pair or free electron pair
Nearly free electron model
Orbital angular momentum of free electrons
Unpaired electron